Manuel Leal (born June 8, 1939), better known as Tinieblas ("Darkness"), is a Mexican luchador.

Professional wrestling career
Tinieblas began as a body builder and stunt man who was spotted by luchadores Black Shadow and Dory Dixon. Impressed by Leal's physique they convinced him to begin a career as a "luchador". In 1968, "Lucha Libre" magazine editor Valente Pérez, came up with the idea of a character that would act as a rival for luchador Mil Mascaras. He created a character with a faceless hood and named him "Tinieblas" (Darkness). Perez selected the former body builder turned luchador to wrestle as that character. Tinieblas debuted as a face on August 20, 1971. He would become a large draw in Mexico and toured internationally. Tinieblas was also one of the first luchadores to tour Japan in 1974. He wrestled at 80 years old on August 18, 2019.

Comic series
Tinieblas was the second luchador (after El Santo) to have a comic book series based on his character. His first comic book was printed between 1976 and 1979. In 1991, a second series titled, "Tinieblas, El Hijo de la Noche" (Tinieblas, Son of the Night) was created. It was printed until 1995. The Tinieblas comic series was relaunched in the year 2000.

Film career
Tinieblas also made appearances in luchador films. In 1971, he starred as a member of a squadron of masked superheroes in the film '"Los Campeones Justicieros"' (The Champions of Justice). Membership in the Champions of Justice included such legendary Mexican wrestling figures as Mil Mascaras, Blue Demon, El Rayo de Jalisco Sr., El Medico Asesino, El Fantasma Blanco and Superzan. He guest-starred in many low-budget foreign series, such as Vendetta and Rederiet.

Legacy
Tinieblas debuted at a relatively old age of 32, so he never reached the same physical peak as many other popular luchadores of his generation. However, his character remains popular with young lucha libre fans, primarily due to his appearance in comic books and films. Tinieblas still wrestles occasionally and has appeared alongside his son Tinieblas Jr.

Videogames
The 2D wrestling arcade game Saturday Night Slam Masters released by Japanese game company Capcom in 1993 featured a final boss character called "El Escorpión" (The Scorpion), whose appearance was inspired by Tinieblas. The character's name in the original Japanese edition of the game was "The Astro" (アストロ, Asutoro).

Filmography
 Los Campeones justicieros (The Champions of Justice) (1971) (credited)
 Superzan el invencible (Superzan the Invincible) (1971)
 Una rosa sobre el ring (A Rose in the Ring) (1973) co-starring Mil Mascaras
 El Castillo de las momias de Guanajuato (The Castle of the Mummies of Guanajuato) (1973)
 Leyendas macabras de la colonia (Macabre Legends of the Colony) (1974) (co-starring Mil Mascaras)
  Las Momias de San Ángel (The Mummies of San Angel) (1975)
 El Investigador Capulina (Investigator Capulina) (1975)
 El Puño de la muerte (Santo in "Fist of Death") (1982) co-starring Santo
 La Furia de las karatecas (Santo in "Fury of the Karate Experts") (1982) co-starring Santo

Championships and accomplishments
World Wrestling Association
WWA World Heavyweight Championship (1 time)

Lucha de Apuesta record

Footnotes

References

General sources - Championship Information

General sources - Career

Specific

1939 births
Living people
Mexican male professional wrestlers
Professional wrestlers from Mexico City
20th-century professional wrestlers
21st-century professional wrestlers